Line 27 of Chongqing Rail Transit is a rapid transit line in Chongqing, China. Construction started in February 2022.

Line 27 trains will through operate with the Bitong Line and continue to Tongliang. The line will feature passing loops for express services.

Stations

References